The Association for Computing Machinery (ACM) is a US-based international learned society for computing. It was founded in 1947 and is the world's largest scientific and educational computing society. The ACM is a non-profit professional membership group, claiming nearly 110,000 student and professional members . Its headquarters are in New York City.

The ACM is an umbrella organization for academic and scholarly interests in computer science (informatics). Its motto is "Advancing Computing as a Science & Profession".

History
In 1947, a notice was sent to various people:
On January 10, 1947, at the Symposium on Large-Scale Digital Calculating Machinery at the Harvard computation Laboratory, Professor Samuel H. Caldwell of Massachusetts Institute of Technology spoke of the need for an association of those interested in computing machinery, and of the need for communication between them.
[...]
After making some inquiries during May and June, we believe there is ample interest to start an informal association of many of those interested in the new machinery for computing and reasoning. Since there has to be a beginning, we are acting as a temporary committee to start such an association:

E. C. Berkeley, Prudential Insurance Co. of America, Newark, N. J.
R. V. D. Campbell, Raytheon Manufacturing Co., Waltham, Mass.
, Bureau of Standards, Washington, D.C.
H. E. Goheen, Office of Naval Research, Boston, Mass.
J. W. Mauchly, Electronic Control Co., Philadelphia, Pa.
T. K. Sharpless, Moore School of Elec. Eng., Philadelphia, Pa.
R. Taylor, Mass. Inst. of Tech., Cambridge, Mass.
C. B. Tompkins, Engineering Research Associates, Washington, D.C. 

The committee (except for Curtiss) had gained experience with computers during World War II: Berkeley, Campbell, and Goheen helped build Harvard Mark I under Howard H. Aiken, Mauchly and Sharpless were involved in building ENIAC, Tompkins had used "the secret Navy code-breaking machines", and Taylor had worked on Bush's Differential analyzers.

The ACM was then founded in 1947 under the name Eastern Association for Computing Machinery, which was changed the following year to the Association for Computing Machinery. The ACM History Committee since 2016 has published the A.M.Turing Oral History project, the ACM Key Award Winners Video Series, and the India Industry Leaders Video project.

Activities

ACM is organized into over 246 local professional chapters and 38 Special Interest Groups (SIGs), through which it conducts most of its activities. Additionally, there are over 833 college and university chapters. The first student chapter was founded in 1961 at the University of Louisiana at Lafayette

Many of the SIGs, such as SIGGRAPH, SIGDA, SIGPLAN, SIGCSE and SIGCOMM, sponsor regular conferences, which have become famous as the dominant venue for presenting innovations in certain fields. The groups also publish a large number of specialized journals, magazines, and newsletters.

ACM also sponsors other computer science related events such as the worldwide ACM International Collegiate Programming Contest (ICPC), and has sponsored some other events such as the chess match between Garry Kasparov and the IBM Deep Blue computer.

Services

Publications

ACM publishes over 50 journals including the prestigious Journal of the ACM, and two general magazines for computer professionals, Communications of the ACM (also known as Communications or CACM) and Queue. Other publications of the ACM include:
ACM XRDS, formerly "Crossroads", was redesigned in 2010 and is the most popular student computing magazine in the US.
ACM Interactions, an interdisciplinary HCI publication focused on the connections between experiences, people and technology, and the third largest ACM publication.
ACM Computing Surveys (CSUR)
Computers in Entertainment (CIE)
ACM Journal on Emerging Technologies in Computing Systems (JETC) 
ACM Special Interest Group: Computers and Society (SIGCAS) 
A number of journals, specific to subfields of computer science, titled ACM Transactions. Some of the more notable transactions include:
ACM Transactions on Algorithms (TALG)
ACM Transactions on Embedded Computing Systems (TECS)
ACM Transactions on Computer Systems (TOCS)
IEEE/ACM Transactions on Computational Biology and Bioinformatics (TCBB)
ACM Transactions on Computational Logic (TOCL)
ACM Transactions on Computer-Human Interaction (TOCHI)
ACM Transactions on Database Systems (TODS)
ACM Transactions on Graphics (TOG)
ACM Transactions on Mathematical Software (TOMS)
ACM Transactions on Multimedia Computing, Communications, and Applications (TOMM)
IEEE/ACM Transactions on Networking (TON)
ACM Transactions on Programming Languages and Systems (TOPLAS)

Although Communications no longer publishes primary research, and is not considered a prestigious venue, many of the great debates and results in computing history have been published in its pages.

ACM has made almost all of its publications available to paid subscribers online at its Digital Library and also has a Guide to Computing Literature. ACM also offers insurance, online courses, and other services to its members.

In 1997, ACM Press published Wizards and Their Wonders: Portraits in Computing, written by Christopher Morgan, with new photographs by Louis Fabian Bachrach. The book is a collection of historic and current portrait photographs of figures from the computer industry.

Portal and Digital Library

The ACM Portal is an online service of the ACM. Its core are two main sections: ACM Digital Library and the ACM Guide to Computing Literature.

The ACM Digital Library is the full-text collection of all articles published by the ACM in its articles, magazines and conference proceedings. The Guide is a bibliography in computing with over one million entries.
The ACM Digital Library contains a comprehensive archive starting in the 1950s of the organization's journals, magazines, newsletters and conference proceedings. Online services include a forum called Ubiquity and Tech News digest. There is an extensive underlying bibliographic database containing key works of all genres from all major publishers of computing literature. This secondary database is a rich discovery service known as The ACM Guide to Computing Literature.

ACM adopted a hybrid Open Access (OA) publishing model in 2013. Authors who do not choose to pay the OA fee must grant ACM publishing rights by either a copyright transfer agreement or a publishing license agreement.

ACM was a "green" publisher before the term was invented. Authors may post documents on their own websites and in their institutional repositories with a link back to the ACM Digital Library's permanently maintained Version of Record.

All metadata in the Digital Library is open to the world, including abstracts, linked references and citing works, citation and usage statistics, as well as all functionality and services. Other than the free articles, the full-texts are accessed by subscription.

There is also a mounting challenge to the ACM's publication practices coming from the open access movement. Some authors see a subscription business model as less relevant and publish on their home pages or on unreviewed sites like arXiv. Other organizations have sprung up which do their peer review entirely free and online, such as Journal of Artificial Intelligence Research, Journal of Machine Learning Research and the Journal of Research and Practice in Information Technology.

ACM has made its publications from 1951 to 2000  open access through its digital library on 7 April 2022 as part of its 75th anniversary of the organisation.

Membership grades

In addition to student and regular members, ACM has several advanced membership grades to recognize those with multiple years of membership and "demonstrated performance that sets them apart from their peers".

The number of Fellows, Distinguished Members, and Senior Members cannot exceed 1%, 10%, and 25% of the total number of professional members, respectively.

Fellows

The ACM Fellows Program was established by Council of the Association for Computing Machinery in 1993 "to recognize and honor outstanding ACM members for their achievements in computer science and information technology and for their significant contributions to the mission of the ACM." There are 1310 Fellows  out of about 100,000 members.

Distinguished Members
In 2006, ACM began recognizing two additional membership grades, one which was called Distinguished Members. Distinguished Members (Distinguished Engineers, Distinguished Scientists, and Distinguished Educators) have at least 15 years of professional experience and 5 years of continuous ACM membership and "have made a significant impact on the computing field". Note that in 2006 when the Distinguished Members first came out, one of the three levels was called "Distinguished Member" and was changed about two years later to "Distinguished Educator". Those who already had the Distinguished Member title had their titles changed to one of the other three titles.

List of Distinguished Members of the Association for Computing Machinery

Senior Members
Also in 2006, ACM began recognizing Senior Members. According to the ACM, "The Senior Members Grade recognizes those ACM members with at least 10 years of professional experience and 5 years of continuous Professional Membership who have demonstrated performance through technical leadership, and technical or professional contributions". Senior membership also requires 3 letters of reference

Distinguished Speakers
While not technically a membership grade, the ACM recognizes distinguished speakers on topics in computer science. A distinguished speaker is appointed for a three-year period. There are usually about 125 current distinguished speakers. The ACM website describes these people as 'Renowned International Thought Leaders'. The distinguished speakers program (DSP) has been in existence for over 20 years and serves as an outreach program that brings renowned experts from Academia, Industry and Government to present on the topic of their expertise.  The DSP is overseen by a committee

Chapters
ACM has three kinds of chapters: Special Interest Groups, Professional Chapters, and Student Chapters.

, ACM has professional & SIG Chapters in 56 countries.

, there exist ACM student chapters in 41 countries.

Special Interest Groups

 SIGACCESS: Accessible Computing
 SIGACT: Algorithms and Computation Theory
 SIGAda: Ada Programming Language
 SIGAI: Artificial Intelligence
 SIGAPP: Applied Computing
 SIGARCH: Computer Architecture
 SIGBED: Embedded Systems
 SIGBio: Bioinformatics 
 SIGCAS: Computers and Society
 SIGCHI: Computer–Human Interaction
 SIGCOMM: Data Communication
 SIGCSE: Computer Science Education
 SIGDA: Design Automation
 SIGDOC: Design of Communication
 SIGecom: Electronic Commerce
 SIGEVO: Genetic and Evolutionary Computation
 SIGGRAPH: Computer Graphics and Interactive Techniques
 SIGHPC: High Performance Computing
 SIGIR: Information Retrieval
 SIGITE: Information Technology Education
 SIGKDD: Knowledge Discovery and Data Mining
 SIGLOG: Logic and Computation
 SIGMETRICS: Measurement and Evaluation
 SIGMICRO: Microarchitecture
 SIGMIS: Management Information Systems
 SIGMM: Multimedia
 SIGMOBILE: Mobility of Systems, Users, Data and Computing
 SIGMOD: Management of Data
 SIGOPS: Operating Systems
 SIGPLAN: Programming Languages
 SIGSAC: Security, Audit, and Control
 SIGSAM: Symbolic and Algebraic Manipulation
 SIGSIM: Simulation and Modeling
 SIGSOFT: Software Engineering
 SIGSPATIAL: Spatial Information
 SIGUCCS: University and College Computing Services
 SIGWEB: Hypertext, Hypermedia, and Web

Conferences

ACM and its Special Interest Groups (SIGs) sponsors numerous conferences with 170 hosted worldwide in 2017. ACM Conferences page has an up-to-date complete list while a partial list is shown below. Most of the SIGs also have an annual conference. ACM conferences are often very popular publishing venues and are therefore very competitive. For example, SIGGRAPH 2007 attracted about 30000 attendees, while CIKM 2005 and RecSys 2022 had paper acceptance rates of only accepted 15% and 17% respectively.

 AIES: Conference on AI, Ethics, and Society
 ASPLOS: International Conference on Architectural Support for Programming Languages and Operating Systems
 CHI: Conference on Human Factors in Computing Systems
 CIKM: Conference on Information and Knowledge Management
 COMPASS: International Conference on Computing and Sustainable Societies
 DAC: Design Automation Conference
 DEBS: Distributed Event Based Systems
 FAccT: Conference on Fairness, Accountability, and Transparency
 FCRC: Federated Computing Research Conference
 GECCO: Genetic and Evolutionary Computation Conference
 HT: Hypertext: Conference on Hypertext and Hypermedia
 JCDL: Joint Conference on Digital Libraries
 MobiHoc: International Symposium on Mobile Ad Hoc Networking and Computing
 SC: Supercomputing Conference
 SIGCOMM: ACM SIGCOMM Conference
 SIGCSE: SIGCSE Technical Symposium on Computer Science Education
 SIGGRAPH: International Conference on Computer Graphics and Interactive Techniques
 RecSys: ACM Conference on Recommender Systems
 TAPIA: Richard Tapia Celebration of Diversity in Computing Conference 

The ACM is a co–presenter and founding partner of the Grace Hopper Celebration of Women in Computing (GHC) with the Anita Borg Institute for Women and Technology.

Some conferences are hosted by ACM student branches; this includes Reflections Projections, which is hosted by UIUC ACM. In addition, ACM sponsors regional conferences. Regional conferences facilitate increased opportunities for collaboration between nearby institutions and they are well attended.

For additional non-ACM conferences, see this list of computer science conferences.

Awards
The ACM presents or co–presents a number of awards for outstanding technical and professional achievements and contributions in computer science and information technology. 

 ACM A. M. Turing Award
 ACM – AAAI Allen Newell Award
 ACM Athena Lecturer Award
 ACM/CSTA Cutler-Bell Prize in High School Computing
 ACM Distinguished Service Award
 ACM Doctoral Dissertation Award
 ACM Eugene L. Lawler Award
 ACM Fellowship, awarded annually since 1993
 ACM Gordon Bell Prize
 ACM Grace Murray Hopper Award
 ACM – IEEE CS George Michael Memorial HPC Fellowships
 ACM – IEEE CS Ken Kennedy Award
 ACM – IEEE Eckert-Mauchly Award
 ACM India Doctoral Dissertation Award
 ACM Karl V. Karlstrom Outstanding Educator Award
 ACM Paris Kanellakis Theory and Practice Award
 ACM Policy Award
 ACM Presidential Award
 ACM Prize in Computing (formerly: ACM – Infosys Foundation Award in the Computing Sciences)
 ACM Programming Systems and Languages Paper Award
 ACM Student Research Competition
 ACM Software System Award
 International Science and Engineering Fair
 Outstanding Contribution to ACM Award
 SIAM/ACM Prize in Computational Science and Engineering

Over 30 of ACM's Special Interest Groups also award individuals for their contributions with a few listed below.

 ACM Alan D. Berenbaum Distinguished Service Award
 ACM Maurice Wilkes Award
 ISCA Influential Paper Award

Leadership

The President of ACM for 2022–2024 is Yannis Ioannidis, Professor at the National and Kapodistrian University of Athens. He is successor of Gabriele Kotsis (2020–2022), Professor at the Johannes Kepler University Linz; Cherri M. Pancake (2018–2020), Professor Emeritus at Oregon State University and Director of the Northwest Alliance for Computational Science and Engineering (NACSE); Vicki L. Hanson (2016–2018), Distinguished Professor at the Rochester Institute of Technology and visiting professor at the University of Dundee; Alexander L. Wolf (2014–2016), Dean of the Jack Baskin School of Engineering at the University of California, Santa Cruz; Vint Cerf (2012–2014), American computer scientist and Internet pioneer; Alain Chesnais (2010–2012); and Dame Wendy Hall of the University of Southampton, UK (2008–2010).

ACM is led by a council consisting of the president, vice-president, treasurer, past president, SIG Governing Board Chair, Publications Board Chair, three representatives of the SIG Governing Board, and seven Members–At–Large. This institution is often referred to simply as "Council" in Communications of the ACM.

Infrastructure
ACM has five "Boards" that make up various committees and subgroups, to help Headquarters staff maintain quality services and products. These boards are as follows:

 Publications Board
 SIG Governing Board
 Education Board
 Membership Services Board
 Practitioners Board

ACM Council on Women in Computing

ACM-W, the ACM council on women in computing, supports, celebrates, and advocates internationally for the full engagement of women in computing. ACM–W's main programs are regional celebrations of women in computing, ACM-W chapters, and scholarships for women CS students to attend research conferences. In India and Europe these activities are overseen by ACM-W India and ACM-W Europe respectively.  ACM-W collaborates with organizations such as the Anita Borg Institute, the National Center for Women & Information Technology (NCWIT), and Committee on the Status of Women in Computing Research (CRA-W).
The ACM-W gives an annual Athena Lecturer Award to honor outstanding women researchers who have made fundamental contributions to computer science.  This program began in 2006. Speakers are nominated by SIG officers.

Partner organizations
ACM's primary partner has been the IEEE Computer Society (IEEE-CS), which is the largest subgroup of the Institute of Electrical and Electronics Engineers (IEEE). The IEEE focuses more on hardware and standardization issues than theoretical computer science, but there is considerable overlap with ACM's agenda. They have many joint activities including conferences, publications and awards. ACM and its SIGs co-sponsor about 20 conferences each year with IEEE-CS and other parts of IEEE. Eckert-Mauchly Award and Ken Kennedy Award, both major awards in computer science, are given jointly by ACM and the IEEE-CS. They occasionally cooperate on projects like developing computing curricula.

ACM has also jointly sponsored on events with other professional organizations like the Society for Industrial and Applied Mathematics (SIAM).

Criticism

In December 2019, the ACM signed a letter to US President Donald J. Trump opposing open access. A petition against this was formed and collected over a thousand signatures. In reaction to this, ACM clarified its position.

The SoCG conference, while originally an ACM conference, parted ways with ACM in 2014 because of problems when organizing conferences abroad.

See also

 ACM Classification Scheme
 Franz Alt, former president

 Edmund Berkeley, co–founder
 Computer science
 Computing
 Bernard Galler, former president
 Fellows of the ACM (by year)
 Fellows of the ACM (category)
 Grace Murray Hopper Award

 Presidents of the Association for Computing Machinery
 Timeline of computing hardware before 1950
 Turing Award
 List of academic databases and search engines

References

External links

ACM portal for publications
ACM Digital Library
Association for Computing Machinery Records, 1947-2009, Charles Babbage Institute, University of Minnesota.
 ACM Upsilon Phi Epsilon  honor society

 
1947 establishments in the United States
Computer science-related professional associations
International learned societies
Organizations established in 1947
501(c)(3) organizations